Paul Christopher Swingle (born December 21, 1966), is a former Major League Baseball pitcher who played in  with the California Angels. He batted and threw right-handed. Swingle had a 0–1 record, with an 8.38 ERA, in 9 games, in his one-year career.

He was drafted by the Angels in the 29th round of the 1989 draft. He attended the Grand Canyon University.

External links

1966 births
Living people
Baseball players from Inglewood, California
Major League Baseball pitchers
California Angels players
Arizona League Angels players
Bend Bucks players
Boise Hawks players
Midland Angels players
New Orleans Zephyrs players
Palm Springs Angels players
Vancouver Canadians players
American expatriate baseball players in Canada
Sportspeople from Mesa, Arizona
Baseball players from Arizona
Grand Canyon Antelopes baseball players
Mesa Thunderbirds baseball players
Chapman Panthers baseball players